Jablance is a settlement in the foothills of the Gorjanci Hills east of Kostanjevica na Krki in eastern Slovenia. The area is part of the traditional region of Lower Carniola. It is now included in the Lower Sava Statistical Region.

Name
The name of the settlement was changed from Jablanice to Jablance in 1990.

References

External links
Jablance on Geopedia

Populated places in the Municipality of Kostanjevica na Krki